Ryan Kenneth Yarborough (born April 26, 1971) is a former professional American football wide receiver who was selected by the New York Jets in the second round (41st overall) of the 1994 NFL Draft. Yarbourough played college football at the University of Wyoming and was one of the most prolific receivers in college football history.

A two-time All-American, he held the NCAA record for career games with a touchdown reception with 27—since broken by Jarett Dillard. He finished his career at Wyoming with 229 receptions for 4,357 yards and 42 touchdowns.

Yarborough's success at the college level did not carry on to the National Football League (NFL). His NFL career lasted only a few years with the Jets and Baltimore Ravens. He also saw action in 2001 for the XFL's Chicago Enforcers.

See also
 List of NCAA major college football yearly receiving leaders
 List of NCAA Division I FBS career receiving touchdowns leaders

References

1971 births
Living people
American football wide receivers
Baltimore Ravens players
Chicago Enforcers players
New York Jets players
Wyoming Cowboys football players
Players of American football from Baltimore
People from Park Forest, Illinois
Players of American football from Illinois